Gottschelia is a genus of liverworts belonging to the family Cephaloziellaceae.

The genus has cosmopolitan distribution.

The genus name of Gottschelia is in honour of Carl Moritz Gottsche (1808–1892), who was a German physician and bryologist born in Altona.

The genus was circumscribed by Riclef Grolle in J. Hattori Bot. Lab. vol.31 on page 13 in 1968.

References

Jungermanniales
Jungermanniales genera